William Murray (born 1953) is an American novelist, journalist, short story, and comic book writer. Much of his fiction has been published under pseudonyms. With artist Steve Ditko, he co-created the superhero Squirrel Girl.

Biography

Early life and career
Will Murray grew up in Boston, Massachusetts and graduated North Quincy High school in June 1971, subsequently graduating summa cum laude from the University of Massachusetts at Boston. After becoming a fan of the pulp fiction hero Doc Savage, he began collecting pulp magazines and wrote two psychological profiles of the character in The Doc Savage Reader. He went on to write for fanzines and edit the fanzines Duende and  Skullduggery before joining the pulp-reprint publisher Odyssey Publications. He also co-authored the study, The Duende History of The Shadow Magazine. Circa 1978, "I discovered the outline to [Doc Savage creator] Lester Dent's unwritten Python Isle and decided to take a shot at writing it. Bantam [Books] passed on it initially, and by the time they came back and asked for it and two more Docs, I was busily ghosting [the adventure paperback series] The Destroyer for [series co-creator] Warren Murphy."

Novels and magazines

The Destroyer assignment had come about when Murray, editing Skullduggery, sought out Murphy and The Destroyer co-creator Richard Sapir for an interview, and later doing freelance research for Sapir. This led to his editing a Destroyer sourcebook, The Assassin's Handbook (1982) and eventually ghostwriting the series, beginning with the 56th book, Encounter Group (1984). He began writing the series regularly with the 69th book, Blood Ties, altogether ghosting book #69 through book #107, Feast or Famine. Murray has also written Cthulhu Mythos stories, including a pair of stories about Nug and Yeb, the Twin Blasphemies, and contributed single novels in The Executioner and Mars Attacks series. He wrote the retro-pulp collection Spicy Zeppelin Stories under various pen names.

Murray, also an author of nonfiction articles about pulp magazine writers such as Doc Savage creator Lester Dent, and the Shadow creator Walter B. Gibson; since 1979, he has been the literary executor for the estate of Dent, and has published twenty-one Doc Savage novels from Dent's outlines under Dent's pseudonym, Kenneth Robeson. His 2013 The Wild Adventures of Doc Savage novel, Doc Savage: Skull Island, teams him up with King Kong.

In June 2015, Altus Press inaugurated the series The Wild Adventures of Tarzan in the novel Tarzan: Return to Pal-ul-don, an authorized sequel to Edger Rice Burroughs' 1921 novel, Tarzan the Terrible. Late in 2016, Altus released a follow-up novel, King Kong Vs. Tarzan. Early in 2020, "Tarzan, Conqueror of Mars" was released, in which John Carter of Mars was revived.

In October 2016, Altus Press released Six Scarlet Scorpions, the first entry in a new spinoff series centering around Doc Savage's adventuress cousin, called The Wild Adventures of Pat Savage. 
Murray wrote the novel from an outline written by the character's creator, Lester Dent.

In August, 2018, Altus Press released The Spider: The Doom Legion, reviving the pulp hero known as The Spider, as well as James Christopher, Operator 5, and G-8 of G-8 and His Battles Aces fame. A sequel, The Spider: Fury in Steel, was published in January, 2021.

In June, 2020, Altus Press released The Wild Adventures of Sherlock Holmes, collecting ten of Murray's Sherlock Holmes short stories.

For Necronomicon Press, he edited Tales of Zothique and The Book of Hyperborea, two collections of stories by Clark Ashton Smith. His essays have appeared in books ranging from S. T. Joshi's compedium on H. P. Lovecraft, An Epicure in the Terrible, to Jim Beard's survey of the 1960s Batman TV show, Gotham City 14 Miles. He also contributed to the encyclopedias St. James Crime and Mystery Writers, St. James Science Fiction Writers, Contemporary Authors and The Dictionary of Literary Biography. A collection of his Doc Savage articles was published by Altus Press under the title, Writings in Bronze, in 2011. As a contributing editor of Starlog magazine, Murray wrote for that publication and for Starlog Press movie tie-in publications.

Murray stories have appeared in The UFO Files, Future Crime, Miskatonic University, 100 Wicked Little Witch Stories, 100 Creepy Little Creature Stories, 100 Vicious Little Vampire Stories, The Cthulhu Cycle, Disciples of Cthulhu II, Cthulhu's Reign, Worlds of Cthulhu, The Yig Cycle, Dead But Dreaming II, Horror for the Holidays, The Mountains of Madness,  Nightbeat: Night Stories and other collections.
 
For National Public Radio, he adapted Lester Dent's 1934 novel The Thousand-Headed Man as a six-part serial for The Adventures of Doc Savage, which aired in 1985, and was released on CD by Radioarchives.com in October 2010.

For Radio Archives, Murray produced the Will Murray Pulp Classics line of audio and ebooks, starring such pulp heroes as The Spider and G-8 and His Battle Aces.

With S. T. Joshi and Jon L. Cooke, Murray organized The Friends of H. P. Lovecraft, which raised funds to place a memorial plaque dedicated to the Providence fantasy writer on the grounds of Brown University's John Hay Library on the centennial of Lovecraft's birth in August 1990.

In 2000 Murray wrote the novel Nick Fury, Agent of S.H.I.E.L.D.: Empyre for Marvel comics. The story, which predicted the operational details of the Year 2001 terror attacks on New York and Washington a year before they transpired, identified the author as a trained remote viewer and professional psychic.

Beginning in 2006, Murray has been a consulting editor for Sanctum Books' Doc Savage, Shadow, Avenger and Whisperer reprints.  He has also written dozens of introductions to the reprints being published by Altus Press, covering characters such as Lester Dent's Lee Nace and Frederick Nebel's Black Mask detective, Ben Donohue. With Off-Trail Publications' John Locke, he has co-edited the three-volume The Gangland Sagas of Big Nose Serrano, which collects all 12 of Anatole Feldman's Big Nose Serrano stories. For Black Dog Books, he penned introductions to their ongoing Lester Dent Library series of pulp-magazine reprints.

Murray's exhaustive survey, Wordslingers: An Epitaph for the Western, delved into the American Western story as it evolved in the pages of the pulp magazines of the first half of the 20th century. 
  
Stepping into the metaphysical and spiritual genre, Murray explored the nature and origin of God in his 2016 ebook, Forever After, which he wrote under his full name of William Patrick Murray. The work is told in the form of a fable, with the narrative unfolding from God's point of view.

Comic books
A contributor to numerous prose anthologies, Murray has written short stories of the characters Superman, Batman, Wonder Woman, Spider-Man, Ant-Man, the Hulk, the Spider, The Avenger, the Gray Seal, the Green Hornet, The Secret 6, Sherlock Holmes, Sky Captain and the World of Tomorrow, Honey West, Zorro and Lee Falk's the Phantom.

For Marvel Comics, Murray co-created the superhero Squirrel Girl with artist Steve Ditko. He scripted The Destroyer black-and-white magazine, as well as single stories starring Iron Man and the Punisher. Murray wrote the introduction to the Marvel Comics Omnibus volume, which celebrates the 70th anniversary of Marvel Comics, as well as introductions to Volume 2 of Daring Mystery Comics, Mighty Thor Masterworks Volume 9, Mystic Comics Volume 1, Young Allies Volume 2 and Golden Age Captain America Volume 6.

Awards
In 1979, he received the Lamont Award for his contributions to the furtherance of pulp fiction research. In 1999, he earned the Comic Book Marketplace award for research excellence in the area of comics history. Murray received the 2011 Pulp Ark Award for Best Series Revival for his work on The Wild Adventures of Doc Savage. His Doc Savage novel, Doc Savage: Skull Island, won the 2014 Pulp Factory Award for Best Novel.

Selected works

Fiction

Novels 
 Python Isle, as by Kenneth Robeson, (1991)  [Doc Savage #184]
 White Eyes, as by Kenneth Robeson, (1992)  [Doc Savage #185]
 The Frightened Fish, as by Kenneth Robeson, (1992)  [Doc Savage #186]
 The Jade Ogre, as by Kenneth Robeson, (1992)  [Doc Savage #187]
 Flight Into Fear, as by Kenneth Robeson, (1993)  [Doc Savage #188]
 The Whistling Wraith, as by Kenneth Robeson, (1993)  [Doc Savage #189]
 The Forgotten Realm, as by Kenneth Robeson, (1993)  [Doc Savage #190]
 Mars Attacks! War Dogs of the Golden Horde, as by Ray W. Murill, Del Rey Books (1996)
 Nick Fury, Agent of Shield: Empyre, Berkley Boulevard Books (2000)
 The Wild Adventures of Doc Savage: The Desert Demons, as by Kenneth Robeson, Altus Press  (2011)
 The Wild Adventures of Doc Savage: Horror in Gold, as by Kenneth Robeson, Altus Press  (2011)
 The Wild Adventures of Doc Savage: The Infernal Buddha, as by Kenneth Robeson, Altus Press  (2012)  
 The Wild Adventures of Doc Savage: Death's Dark Domain, as by Kenneth Robeson, Altus Press  (2012)  
 The Wild Adventures of Doc Savage: The Miracle Menace, as by Kenneth Robeson, Altus Press  (2013)  
 The Wild Adventures of Doc Savage: Phantom Lagoon, as by Kenneth Robeson, Altus Press  (2013)  
 The Wild Adventures of Doc Savage: Skull Island, Altus Press (2013)
 The Wild Adventures of Doc Savage: The War Makers, as by Kenneth Robeson, Altus Press  (2014)  
 The Wild Adventures of Doc Savage: The Ice Genius, as by Kenneth Robeson, Altus Press  (2014) 
 The Wild Adventures of Doc Savage: The Sinister Shadow, as by Kenneth Robeson, Altus Press (2015)
 The Wild Adventures of Tarzan (Vol 1): Return to Pal-ul-don, Altus Press (2015)
 The Wild Adventures of Pat Savage (Vol 1): Six Scarlet Scorpions, Altus Press (2016)
 King Kong vs. Tarzan, Altus Press (2016)
 The Wild Adventures of Doc Savage: Glare of the Gorgon, as by Kenneth Robeson, Altus Press (2016)  
 The Wild Adventures of Doc Savage: Empire of Doom, as by Kenneth Robeson, Altus Press (2017)   
 The Wild Adventures of Doc Savage: Mr. Calamity & The Valley of Eternity, as by Kenneth Robeson, Altus Press (2018)  
 The Wild Adventures of The Spider (Book 1): The Doom Legion, Altus Press (2018)
 The Wild Adventures of Edgar Rice Burroughs: Tarzan, Conqueror of Mars, Altus Press (2020)
 The Wild Adventures of The Spider (Book 2): Fury in Steel, Altus Press (2021)
 The Wild Adventures of The Spider (Book 3): Scourge of the Scorpion, Altus Press (2022)

Collections 
 The Wild Adventures of Sherlock Holmes, (2020)
 The Wild Adventures of Cthulhu: Volume One, Odyssey Publications (2022)

Short stories 
 "Snail Ghost," Eldritch Tales #11, 1985
 "A Trillion Young," in Tales from the Miskatonic University Library (PS Publishing, 2017)

Comic book stories 
 "The Coming of ... Squirrel Girl" (origin story), Marvel Super-Heroes, Winter 1991

Nonfiction

Books 
 The Duende History of the Shadow Magazine, Odyssey Publications (1980)
 Writings in Bronze, Altus Press (2011)
 Wordslingers: An Epitaph for the Western, Altus Press (2013)
 Master of Mystery: The Rise of The Shadow, Odyssey Publications (2021)

Articles 
 "Narrathoth, the Forgotten," Crypt of Cthulhu #35, Hallowmas 1985

Introductions 
 The Gangland Sagas of Big Nose Serrano: Vol 1: Dames, Dice and the Devil, by Anatole Feldman, Off-Trail Publications (2008)
 The Gangland Sagas of Big Nose Serrano: Vol 2: Horses, Hoboes and Heroes, by Anatole Feldman, Off-Trail Publications (2008)
 Thunder Jim Wade: The Complete Series, by Henry Kuttner, Altus Press (2008)
 The Bat Strikes Again And Again!, by Johnston McCulley, Altus Press (2009)
 The Gangland Sagas of Big Nose Serrano: Vol 3: Hell's Gangster, by Anatole Feldman, Off-Trail Publications (2009)
 Super-Detective Jim Anthony: The Complete Series, Vol 1, by Victor Rousseau, Altus Press (2009)
 When the Death-Bat Flies: The Detective Stories of Norvell Page, Altus Press (2010)
 G Stands for Glory: The G-Man Stories of Norvell Page, Altus Press (2010)
 The Crimes of The Scarlet Ace: The Complete Stories of Major Lacy & Amusement, Inc., by Theodore A. Tinsley, Altus Press (2011)
 The Cobra: The King of Detectives, by Richard B. Sale, Altus Press (2011)
 King of Fang and Claw: The Complete Pulp Magazine Adventures, by Bob Byrd, Altus Press (2011)
 The Complete Casebook of Cardigan, Vol 1: 1931-32, by Frederick Nebel, Altus Press (2013)
 Operator #5: The Complete Purple Wars, by Emile C. Tepperman, Altus Press (2019)

Obituaries 
 "Walter B. Gibson," Locus, January 1986
 "Walter M. Baumhofer," Locus, November 1987
 "Norman Saunders," Locus, May 1989

References

External links 
  

Living people
1953 births
20th-century American male writers
20th-century American novelists
20th-century American short story writers
21st-century American male writers
21st-century American novelists
21st-century American short story writers
American comics writers
Cthulhu Mythos writers
H. P. Lovecraft scholars
Pulp fiction writers